The 2007 National Games, also known as the 33rd National Games of India and informally as Assam 2007 was the 33rd edition of the National Games of India, held from 9 February 2007 to 18 February 2007 in Guwahati, Assam, India.

Indian National Congress president Sonia Gandhi declared the 33rd National Games open amid clamorous cheering from the 30,000 strong crowd at the Indira Gandhi Athletic Stadium. Bihar, Puducherry and Tripura did not participate in the games.

Medal table

Closing ceremony
Capacity crowd witnessed the closing ceremony. Prime Minister of India Manmohan Singh, Governor of Assam  Ajai Singh, Chief Minister of Assam Tarun Gogoi and Indian Olympic Association president Suresh Kalmadi were also present at the ceremony.

References

External links
 Official website

National Games of India
National Games of India
2007 in multi-sport events